The Future of the Internet and How to Stop It is a book published in 2008 by Yale University Press and authored by Jonathan Zittrain. The book discusses several legal issues regarding the Internet.

The book is made available under the Creative Commons Attribution Non-Commercial Share-Alike 3.0 license.

References

External links
 The Future of the Internet and How to Stop It by Jonathan L. Zittrain, provided online by Yale University Press.

Books about the Internet
Creative Commons-licensed books
2008 non-fiction books
Yale University Press books